Serious is the second studio album released by the Whitehead Bros. released on August 23, 1994 through Motown.

Track listing
All tracks composed by Kenny Whitehead; except where indicated
"Forget I Was a G" (Kenny Whitehead, Errol Johnson) - 4:06  
"Your Love Is a 187" (Kenny Whitehead, Errol Johnson, Dr. Dre, Snoop) - 4:43  
"Shaniqua" (Roy "Dog" Pennon, Suamana "Swoop" Brown; rap written by Kenny Whitehead) - 4:05  
"Change" (Eric Codee, Bert Price) - 4:08  
"Interlude" - 1:26  
"Late Nite Tip" - 4:06  
"Just a Touch of Love" (Mark Adams, Dan Webster, Mark Hicks; rap written by Kenny Whitehead) - 5:12  
"Where Ya At? (Interlude)" - 2:23  
"Serious" - 4:25  
"Beautiful Black Princess" - 3:42  
"Sex on the Beach" - 4:29  
"Turn U Out" - 4:58  
"She Needed Me" (McKinley Horton, Anne Gore) - 5:58  
"Love Goes On" (kenny Whitehead, Johnny Whitehead, Anita Whitehead) - 5:07  
"Beautiful Black Princess (Reprise)" - 1:25

Personnel
Whitehead Bros.
 Henny Whitehead - vocals, keyboards
 Johnny Whitehead - vocals

Charts

1994 debut albums
Motown albums